Ali Saleh Mohammed Al-Nemer (born 25 August 1991) is a Saudi Arabian international footballer who plays as a midfielder for Saudi club Al-Fayha.

Club career
Born in Riyadh, Al-Nemer never played with any professional clubs before being called up for the national team in 2017. In January 2018, after impressing with the national side, he signed an 18-month professional contract with Al-Shabab FC, and on 21 January, he was loaned to Spanish Segunda División side CD Numancia for six months.

Al-Nemer left Numancia on 15 May 2018 without playing a single minute.

On 17 July 2018, Al-Nemer officially signed for newly promoted club Al-Wehda.

On 25 October 2020, Al-Nemer officially signed for Al-Taawoun.

On 30 January 2022, Al-Nemer joined Al-Fayha.

International career
Called up to the Saudi Arabia national team in December 2017 for the 23rd Arabian Gulf Cup, Al-Nemer made his full international debut on 25 December, starting in a 0–0 draw against United Arab Emirates.

References

External links

1991 births
Living people
Saudi Arabian people of Yemeni descent
Saudi Arabian footballers
Sportspeople from Riyadh
Association football midfielders
Al-Shabab FC (Riyadh) players
CD Numancia players
Al-Wehda Club (Mecca) players
Al-Taawoun FC players
Al-Fayha FC players
Saudi Professional League players
Saudi Arabia international footballers
Saudi Arabian expatriate footballers
Expatriate footballers in Spain
Saudi Arabian expatriate sportspeople in Spain
Naturalised citizens of Saudi Arabia